Belle, Sebastian and the Horses was a children's television programme from 1968.  It was a sequel to the 1965 series Belle and Sebastian, and also starred Mehdi El Glaoui as Sebastian. It was filmed in France as Sébastien parmi les hommes as 13 colour episodes, and re-titled by the BBC.

In it, Sebastian goes to spend some time on a horse ranch. The English title may be a slight misnomer as the dog Belle only appears fairly briefly, she is separated from the horses after she reacts negatively barking at them. It was not quite as successful as the earlier series, although it was repeated a couple of times by the BBC after its first screening in late 1968, and also shown once by RTÉ.

External links 
Article

References 
1968 French television series debuts
1968 French television series endings
1960s children's television series
1960s French television series
BBC Television shows
French television shows based on children's books
Television shows based on French novels
French children's television series
French drama television series
Television shows set in France